Maykor is a rural locality (a settlement) and the administrative center of Maykorskoye Rural Settlement, Yusvinsky District, Perm Krai, Russia. The population was 2,756 as of 2010. There are 47 streets.

Geography 
Maykor is located 59 km east of Yusva (the district's administrative centre) by road. Gorki is the nearest rural locality.

References 

Rural localities in Yusvinsky District